Szabolcs Marcell Balog (born 23 February 1988) is a Hungarian footballer who currently plays for Kecskeméti TE.

References 

European Football Clubs & Squads
Profile at HLSZ

1988 births
Living people
People from Kecskemét
Hungarian footballers
Association football forwards
Kecskeméti TE players
Békéscsaba 1912 Előre footballers
EB/Streymur players
Ceglédi VSE footballers
Hungarian expatriate footballers
Expatriate footballers in the Faroe Islands
Hungarian expatriate sportspeople in the Faroe Islands
Sportspeople from Bács-Kiskun County